Khalifan (also Romanized as Khalīfān) is a city in, and the capital of, Khalifan District of Mahabad County, West Azerbaijan province, Iran. At the 2006 census, its population was 425 in 77 households, when it was a village. The following census in 2011 counted 962 people in 128 households, by which time it had been elevated to the status of a city. The latest census in 2016 showed a population of 749 people in 119 households.

References 

Mahabad County

Cities in West Azerbaijan Province

Populated places in West Azerbaijan Province

Populated places in Mahabad County